Unedogemmula stoffelsi is an extinct species of sea snail, a marine gastropod mollusk in the family Turridae, the turrids.

Description
The length of the shell attains 15 mm.

Distribution
This extinct marine species was found in Miocene strata in Belgium.

References

External links
  R Marquet, The Pliocene turrid Gastropods of Belgium Part 1: Drilliidae, Turridae, Conidae (genus Bela); BULLETIN VAN HET KONINKLIJK BELGISCH INSTITUUT VOOR NATUURWETENSCHAPPEN, AARDWETENSCHAPPEN. 67: 119-151. 1997 
 Paul Cogels, Annales de la Société malacologique de Belgique, tome IX, 1874

stoffelsi
Gastropods described in 1845